Orlando Burrell (July 26, 1826 – June 7, 1921) was a U.S. Representative from Illinois for one term from 1895 to 1897.

Life and career
Born in Newton, Pennsylvania, Burrell moved with his parents to White County, Illinois, in 1834. He attended the common schools. He engaged in agricultural pursuits. During the Civil War he raised a company of Cavalry in June 1861, and was elected its captain, and was attached to the First Regiment, Illinois Volunteer Cavalry. He served as judge of White County 1873-1881. Sheriff of White County 1892-1894. He served as delegate to the Republican National Convention at Minneapolis in 1892.

Congress
Burrell was elected as a Republican to the Fifty-fourth Congress (March 4, 1895 – March 3, 1897). He was an unsuccessful candidate for reelection in 1896 to the Fifty-fifth Congress. He retired from public life and resumed his agricultural pursuits.

Death
He died in Carmi, Illinois, June 7, 1921. He was interred in Maple Ridge Cemetery.

References

1826 births
1921 deaths
Illinois state court judges
Illinois sheriffs
People from White County, Illinois
Union Army officers
Republican Party members of the United States House of Representatives from Illinois
Military personnel from Illinois